Kuntala may refer to:

 Kuntala country, a historical region in Karnataka state of India
 Kuntala, Adilabad district, a village in Telangana, India
 Kuntala Waterfall
 Kantoli, a 5th-century historical kingdom in Sumatra, Indonesia